The Louis Vuitton Trophy La Maddalena was the third in a scheduled series of regattas that compete for the Louis Vuitton Trophy. The regatta occurred in La Maddalena between 22 May - 6 June 2010. The Louis Vuitton Trophy format uses existing International America's Cup Class yachts loaned to the regatta by various America's Cup racing syndicates, keeping costs relatively low for the competing teams.

The Louis Vuitton Trophy was organised after the success of the Louis Vuitton Pacific Series and the continued legal battle surrounding the America's Cup yachting competition at the time. Because of the long delays from the legal action, and the fact that the 2010 America's Cup became a Deed of Gift match without a defender or challenger selection series, the Louis Vuitton Trophy series was established as a competition for other America's Cup racing syndicates.

The La Maddalena event was hosted by Mascalzone Latino and the Reale Yacht Club Canottieri Savoia.

The Yachts

The event used International America's Cup Class yachts loaned specifically for the event. For La Maddalena, the boats were supplied by BMW Oracle Racing (USA 87 and USA 98) and Mascalzone Latino Audi Team (ITA 90 and ITA 99).

USA 87 and 98 were damaged on day four when they collided. They were unavailable for the rest of the regatta.

Teams
La Maddalena attracted ten racing syndicates, increasing from the eight teams that appeared in the earlier Nice Côte d’Azur and Auckland Louis Vuitton Trophy regattas.

The Races

Round Robin
22 May-3 June
* Mascalzone Latino deducted a point for a 'hard contact' incident in their race against All4One.
* Aleph was immediately deducted a point for 'hard contact' when their boat collided with Azzura causing serious damage on day four. The international jury then deducted Aleph three further points for failing to avoid contact. The jury absolved Azzurra fully for the incident.
BMW Oracle Racing vs Team New Zealand was originally sailed on the 28 May with BMW Oracle winning the match after Team New Zealand was penalised for not maintaining enough tension on their forestay. Team New Zealand immediately appealed the ruling but the international jury was unable to award them redress. The rule was removed from the book the next day and it was decided to resail the race. BMW Oracle then asked for redress but that was denied by the jury. Team New Zealand won the resail on the 30 May.

Elimination Finals
3–6 June
The final series was originally scheduled to use the McIntyre final eight system, as in Auckland. However due to the loss of several days of racing, due to weather and the collision between USA 87 and USA 98, the finals were rescheduled to consist of knock out semi finals and a final. One quarterfinal was raced before the format was changed. The higher ranked team from each quarterfinal that was abandoned automatically advanced into the semifinals. The petit finale to decide third place was also canceled.

The Final

Junior Trophy
The junior trophy was sailed in O'Pen Bic dinghies off the mouth of the Marina Arsenale. The series was won by Giulio Bellitti, from Club Nautico Pesaro. He received a place as 18th man in one of the finalists.

References

External links
 YachtsandYachting.com
 Thedailysail.com
 www.louisvuittontrophy.com/ Official Website

        
        
        
        

Louis Vuitton regattas
International America's Cup Class
2010 in sailing
Sailing competitions in Italy
2010 in Italian sport